The eighth cycle of America's Next Top Model aired from February 28, 2007 to May 16, 2007, and was the second season of the series to be aired on The CW network.

The winner, similar to all of the cycles aired on The CW network, received representation by Elite Model Management, a cover & six-page spread within Seventeen magazine, and a US$100,000 contract with CoverGirl cosmetics.

The international destination during this cycle was Sydney, Australia, the show's first visit to Oceania.

The cycle's promotional tagline was "Welcome To The Jungle, Ladies" and the promotional theme songs were both Danity Kane's "One Shot" and Shiny Toy Guns' "Le Disko."

The winner was 20-year-old Jaslene Gonzalez from Chicago, Illinois, who notably had made it to the semi-finals of cycle 7, but was not cast. Gonzalez became the first winner without any bottom two appearance. Natasha Galkina placed as the runner up this season.

The cycle's finale episode attracted more than 6.6 million viewers, a record for both the franchise and the CW.

Contestants
(Ages stated are at start of contest)

Episodes

Summaries

Call-out order

 The contestant was eliminated
 The contestant won the competition

Bottom two

 The contestant was eliminated after their first time in the bottom two
 The contestant was eliminated after their second time in the bottom two
 The contestant was eliminated after their third time in the bottom two
 The contestant was eliminated in the final judging and placed as the runner-up

Average  call-out order
Casting call-out order and final two are not included.

Photo Shoot Guide
Episode 1 photo shoot was split in two halves:
First half: Mark Ecko's Pool Party (casting)
Second half: Political Controversies
Episode 2 photo shoot: Highschool clichés
Episode 3 photo shoot: Nude Candy-coated
Episode 4 photo shoot: Crime Scene Victims
Episode 5 photo shoot: Gender-swap
Episode 6 photo shoot: Four Personalities Beautyshots
Episode 7 photo shoot: Unforgettable ANTM moments with Past Contestants
Episode 8 commercial: CoverGirl Queen Mascara Commercial with Australian Accent
Episode 10 photo shoots: Swimsuits for Women's and Men's Magazines
Episode 11 photo shoot: Aboriginal Dances
Episode 12 photo shoots & Commercial: Covergirl beauty shot; "My Life As A Covergirl" commercial shoot for truShine lip color; Seventeen magazine covers

Other cast members
 Jay Manuel – photography
 Sutan – make-up
 Christian Marc – hair
 Anda & Masha – wardrobe

Makeovers
 Cassandra - Voluminous afro
 Felicia - Long layered curly black weave with bangs
 Diana - Long blonde extensions
 Sarah - Cut shorter and dyed light brown
 Whitney - Long wavy black weave
 Jael - Long dark brown weave; later, Mia Farrow inspired pixie cut
 Brittany - Long wavy red weave; later, weave removed
 Dionne - Kelis inspired cut and dyed black
 Renee - Yoanna House inspired cut
 Natasha - Vidal Sassoon inspired shoulder length cut and dyed chocolate brown
 Jaslene - Trimmed and blown-out

Post-Top Model careers

Renee DeWitt was signed with NEXT Model Management and appeared on Modelville. On December 10, 2014, DeWitt was sentenced to 12 years in prison after pleading guilty to four felony burglary counts, one count of vehicle theft, one count of firearm possession and one misdemeanor count of identity theft. She was dismissed of more than a dozen other counts under a plea agreement.
Whitney Cunningham had posed for some test shots and was in Plus magazine and IMT Styles magazine. She used to be signed with CESD Modeling Agency. She is now the president of a marketing company.
Kathleen DuJour posed for some test shots. She now works as a hair stylist in Brooklyn.
Samantha Francis was signed with Fusion Model Management in New York City, Apple Model Management in Bangkok and Style International Management in Hong Kong. She used to be signed with Elite Model Management in New York. Her print work credits include Knit.1, Ming Pao Weekly, Macau Closer Lifestyle, Harper's Bazaar Hong Kong and Thailand, Elle Thailand, Seventeen and Elle UK. She was featured as a "Top Model in Action" during cycle 13.
Natasha Galkina is currently signed with Red Model Management in New York City, under the name "Alie M", NEXT Management in Milan and Elite Model Management in New York. She used to be signed with MUSE Modeling Agency in New York, IMG Models in New York,  MGMT First in New York City, Ace Model Management in Athens, Beatrice International Models in Milan, Wilhelmina Models in Los Angeles and Ford Models in New York. She also appeared in editorials for Italian Vogue as well as A Cover Of Beauty In Vogue In Russia, Teen Vogue, I-D Magazine, Elle Magazine, Seventeen Magazine, Harper's Bazaar in Hong Kong, Fashion Magazine, Vanity Fair, Marie Claire and Maxim Magazine. She also signed with Fenton Moon New York, along with other alumni Andrea Debevc and Mikaela Schipani.
Jaslene Gonzalez is currently signed with MC2 Models in New York, Faces Model Management in Malaysia and Exodus Model Management. She has modeled for the New York Post (Tempo), Us Weekly, In Touch Weekly, had a 6-page spread in an issue of Vibe Vixen magazine, a 12-page fashion spread for ZooZoom Magazine. Named One Of Latina Magazine's Latinas Of the Year, had a 9-page spread for Colures (U.K. fashion Magazine), was featured in Trace: Model Behaviour as Falls new faces, has been on the covers and had spreads of over a dozen magazines such as [Latina, Imagen, Hombre, 6 Degrees, FN, ZooZoom, Fashion Salon Seventeen, Urban Latino, Bleu, Vanidades, Scene, JamRock, Splendor, Time Out. and Metrostyle Catalog. She has also appeared in Lot29 Fall/Winter 07-08 and Spring/Summer 08 ad campaigns; she has had a total of four billboards in Times Square so far. Also, she shares one of her Lot29 billboards in Times Square, New York with Katarzyna Dolinska. Gonzalez shot an ad campaign for online retailer ShopBop, 8-page fashion spreads for both Scene Magazine and JamRock Magazine. She is also featured on the pages of Living Proof Magazine, American Salon Magazine and currently has an ad campaign with Marianne Stores. Gonzalez has had an Ad Campaign for designer Cesar Galindo 's Spring 2008 Collection and appeared on the pages of Supermodels Unlimited Magazine twice for the August and September/October 2008 issues. Gonzalez is also part of the "Heart On My Sleeve" clothing campaign by Aubrey O'Day. Gonzalez is on the pages of YRB Magazine. She has also been featured on COACD, fashionista.com and in Women's Wear Daily. Gonzalez currently has nationwide campaigns with Garnier Nutrisse, and Southpole. In addition, Kett Cosmetics, Marianne Stores F/W 09, and Recession Denim F/W 09 campaigns. She has also been on the cover Nuovo Magazine. She has been on the cover of Nylon Mexico. In India, she has been in Marie Claire (June 2012), New Woman and Grazia. She was in the Celestino Couture 2017 Lookbook.
Brittany Hatch was signed with Beatrice International Models in Milan and with New York Model Management. She was in magazines such as South, DS and Twill. She was a model for tests shots by Sarah VonderHaar.
Felicia Provost used to be signed with Elite Model Management in Chicago. She was in Time Out Chicago and Brune magazine. She is now a dance teacher in Hong Kong.
Jael Strauss used to be signed with Otto Models and also had her own clothing line with Hitch Couture. As of 2012, Strauss was reported to be battling methamphetamine addiction. Appearing on the Dr. Phil show on September 13, 2012, she discussed her struggle with addiction. She  made a full recovery and modeled for HeartWater and The Legging Project in 2017. In 2018, she was diagnosed with stage 4 breast cancer and died at age 34 on December 4, 2018.
Sarah VonderHaar was signed with Elite Model Management in Chicago. She became a recording artist and had a debut album in 2008 called "Are You Listening Now" with music videos for "I Got Sunshine" and "All Mine".
Dionne Walters was signed with Eye Candy Model Management. She was in magazines such as Kontrol, Upgrade and Ellements.
Cassandra Watson was signed with Look Model Agency in San Francisco and SMG Models in Seattle.
Diana Zalewski continued her education, and posed for some test shots. She modeled for Skorch magazine in 2007.

Death of Jael Strauss
On December 4, 2018 Strauss died at age 34 due to stage 4 inflammatory breast cancer.

Notes

References

External links
Official page at The CW
America's Next Top Model at the Internet Movie Database
Entertainment Tonight
Pictures and Official Previews at tv.yahoo.com
TV Guide.com Interviews Eliminated Contestants

A08
2007 American television seasons
Television shows filmed in California
Television shows filmed in Australia